Karen Ann Rubin (born Karen Ann Roy) is an entrepreneur. She joined HubSpot where she co-hosted HubSpot TV, and was entrepreneur-in-residence at Matrix Partners in 2013-2014. In 2014, she joined Quantopian as Vice President of Product Management. In 2015 she authored a study that shows that women-led companies perform better than average. She started  her career in 2004 in investment banking.

Early life and education 
Rubin's father, David C. Roy,  is a physicist turned kinetic sculptor and her mother is a sculptor turned business person. From an early age, she showed in interest in presenting to the camera. She completed her BS in Computer Science at Trinity College in Hartford, Connecticut in 2004. She lettered ten times in cross-country, two times as Captain in the All Americans Division III Cross Country of the U.S. Track & Field and Cross Country Coaches Association.

Career 
 
Beginning her career in 2004 in investment banking, she then completed four years as project manager for Promotions (acquired by TheStreet.com in 2007). She moved to Boston to join HubSpot as employee number 30 in 2008. Although her main job there was product management, she also co-hosted several hundred weekly episodes of a webcast called first "HubSpot TV" then "Marketing Update." In 2013-2014 she spent 14 months as entrepreneur-in-residence at Matrix Partners. From 2014 to 2016, she was VP of Product at Quantopian. In 2016 Rubin joined the robotics and teleconferencing company, Owl Labs, as VP of Growth.

Study of performance of women-led businesses 
In 2015, Rubin published a study that shows that a hypothetical portfolio of investments in women-led companies would perform three times better than an investment in an index fund based on the S&P 500 over the same period. Her study was inspired by a Credit Suisse’s Gender 3000 report, specifically that "Companies with more than one woman on the board have returned a compound 3.7% a year over those that have none..." and yet paradoxically only "12.7% of boards had gender diversity."

References 

Living people
American business theorists
Business speakers
Marketing speakers
Marketing women
American women investors
American investors
American investment bankers
Year of birth missing (living people)
American women bankers
21st-century American businesswomen
21st-century American businesspeople